Gerard Simon "Jops" Reeman (9 August 1886 in Amerongen – 16 March 1959 in Zeist) was a Dutch football player who competed in the 1908 Summer Olympics. He was a member of the Dutch team, which won the bronze medal in the football tournament.

References

External links
 
 
 

1886 births
1959 deaths
Dutch footballers
Footballers at the 1908 Summer Olympics
Netherlands international footballers
Olympic bronze medalists for the Netherlands
Olympic footballers of the Netherlands
Olympic medalists in football
People from Amerongen
Medalists at the 1908 Summer Olympics
Association football forwards
Footballers from Utrecht (province)